The Pentecost University is a private university located at Sowutuom in the Greater Accra Region of Ghana. It was founded by The Church of Pentecost (COP) and evolved from The Pentecost Bible College which initially trained only Lay Leaders and full-time Ministers for the COP. On May 22, 2003, J. A. Kufuor, the former President of Ghana, inaugurated PUC at the Sowutuom campus. The first PUC Council was inducted on May 6, 2004. Pentvars was accredited by the National Accreditation Board (NAB), Ghana in November 2004 and awarded its Presidential Charter on May 28, 2020, by Nana Addo Dankwa Akufo-Addo, the President of the Republic of Ghana. Prior to receiving a Presidential Charter, the university was affiliated to the Kwame Nkrumah University of Science and Technology, University of Cape Coast, and University of Ghana. On June 1, 2020, the university announced the appointment of Rev. Prof. Kwabena Agyapong-Kodua, who replaces Apostle Daniel Okyere Walker, as the first Vice-Chancellor since the university became fully-fledged.

The student population is about 3000, made up of students enrolled in degree, certificate and professional programmes.

The main campus of Pentecost University is sited at Sowutuom, away from Accra. Sowutuom (which literally translates “hold your gun”) is within the western parts of Accra, a quiet and serene area off the Kwashieman-Ofankor highway.

Faculties
Currently, the university has four Faculties namely, Faculty of Engineering, Science and Computing (FESAC), Faculty of Business Administration (FBA), Faculty of Theology and Mission (FTM) and Faculty of Health and Allied Sciences (FHAS). It also has to its credit the Pentecost University Graduate School (PUGS)  and the College of Foundation and Professional Studies (COFOPS) (See University website: https://pentvars.edu.gh/ for a detailed list of all degree, certificate and professional programmes).

Professional programmes
The university also runs professional programmes designed to keep students up to the latest trends in their respective work environment.
Foundation and professional programmes under the COFOPS include:
 Association of Business Executives (ABE)
 National Computing Centre Education (NCC Education)
 Chartered Institute of Marketing (CIM UK)
 Certificate in Theology & Church Administration
 Certificate in Alternative Conflict Resolution
 Certificate in Business Administration
 Certificate in Leadership and Governance in Health Systems Management
 Certificate in Holistic Early Child Care Development
 Chartered Institute of Logistics and Transport (CILT)
 BCS Approved Centre (Professional IT Training)
 Institute of Chartered Accountants Ghana (ICAG)

Affiliations
Pentvars holds established agreements with several internationally recognised bodies and Universities for Faculty, student and staff exchange, potential funding as well as collaborative research. These bodies include Saginaw Valley State University, USA; London South Bank University, Bucks New University, University of Salford and NCC Education, all in the UK.  Pentvars is also a member of the following Associations: Association of African Universities, Council for Advancement and Support of Education (CASE), USA, and Council of Independent Universities, Ghana.

Notable alumni 

 Jacinta Ocansey, female stand-up comedian
Joe Mettle, award-winning Ghanaian gospel musician 
Kweku Frimpong, Ghanaian oil and insurance businessman

See also
 List of universities in Ghana

Notes

External links
 National Accreditation Board
 Pentecost University College
 Church of Pentecost - Pentecost University

Christian universities and colleges in Ghana
Educational institutions established in 2003
Education in Accra
Pentecostal universities and colleges
2003 establishments in Ghana